The Battle of Choronea can refer to:

Battle of Coronea (447 BC)
Battle of Coronea (394 BC)